Israel Barnes "Foots" Milam (January 4, 1906 – December 18, 1979) was an American football guard, tackle, and coach. He played one season in the National Football League (NFL) for the Philadelphia Eagles, appearing in two games. He later coached several high school football teams in Texas.

Early life and education
Milam was born on January 4, 1906, in Hagerman, Texas. He played football at Denison High School and also attended Sherman High School. While at Denison, he was team captain, playing the tackle position. Milam attended Austin College from 1926 to 1929, and played for their football team in his final two years with the school. He was twice named All-Texas Conference and was co-team captain as a senior.

Coaching and professional career
After graduating from Austin in 1930, Milam became the head coach at Sulphur Springs High School. He was the first coach to lead them to an undefeated season. After three seasons there, he returned to his alma mater, Austin College, to finish his master's degree and become assistant line coach. Milam was replaced at Austin College in 1934, after the school hired a new football coach.

After being replaced at Austin, Milam, jobless, was convinced by a friend to try out for the Philadelphia Eagles of the National Football League (NFL). He joined the team in August and received a contract giving him $75 per game. Milam later recalled his professional experience in an interview with the Austin American-Statesman: "Never forget it. I was out of a job and they offered me $75 a game to play with the Eagles. Everyone wasn't eating regular back in those days and it looked like awful big money to me. It was, too." He appeared in a total of two games with the team, both as a backup, as they finished with a record of 4–7.

After the Eagles' season ended, Milam returned to Texas and began teaching at Howe High School. In 1935, he helped create their football team and served as its first head coach. He created their playbook and led them to a 6–4 record in his first and only season with them. In their first game, they lost 12–0 to Tioga High School, the eventual district champions. At the end of the season, they scheduled an exhibition rematch against Tioga and won 38–0.

After a season at Lewisville High School in 1936, Milam became the head coach at Richardson High School. He coached them to multiple district championships and in his first year was named coach on the district all-star team. Milam was hired in 1942 as an assistant coach at Orange High School, later becoming the head in 1943. He also served as Orange's athletic director. In 1945, he led the school to a 7–3 record, including a win over Port Arthur High School, which was the first time in 18 years they had accomplished this.

In 1946, Milam left Orange to become head coach and athletic director at Midland High School. He resigned following the 1948 season. Afterwards, he was hired by Rotary Engineers, a well-known logging firm. In mid-1949, he also was hired to coach the "B" team at Austin High School. After four seasons in that position, he joined Travis High School as head football coach in 1953. Milam resigned prior to the 1955 season to become assistant principal at the school. Travis had compiled a record of 8–11–1 under him.

Later life and death
Milam for years served with Travis, eventually in the mid-1960s becoming head principal. He retired at the end of 1971. Milam was married and had one son. He died on December 18, 1979, at the age of 73.

References

1906 births
1979 deaths
American football tackles
American football guards
Austin Kangaroos football players
Players of American football from Texas
Coaches of American football from Texas
Philadelphia Eagles players
High school football coaches in Texas